Dieter Schwemmle (born 28 July 1949) is a retired German football forward.

Career

Statistics

References

External links
 

1949 births
Living people
German footballers
Bundesliga players
VfB Stuttgart players
VfB Stuttgart II players
FC Twente players
Kickers Offenbach players
FC Biel-Bienne players
AC Bellinzona players
VfL Bochum players
Bulova SA players
Association football forwards
Footballers from Stuttgart